Apifresh is a European project funded by the European Commission 7th Framework Program. It started on 1 July 2010 and it will last three years. The project is developed by a Consortium set up by partners from different European Countries. It is formed by four Industrial Associations, three SMEs and three research centres.

Apifresh project has come out in several media:
 La Rioja Government newsletter
 IST-WORLD
 Madrimasd (Science and Research News from Spain)
 Magazize O Apicultor
 Computers and Electronics in Agriculture 
 Micron

The partners
The coordinator is the research centre Tecnologías Avanzadas Inspiralia. The Industrial Associations are: European Professional Beekeepers Association; Orszagos Magyar Meheszeti Egyesulet; Federecao Nacional dos Apicultores de Portugal and Centro Tecnológico Nacional de la Conserva y Alimentación. The three SMEs are: Campomiel from Spain; Balparmak from Turkey and Parco Tecnologico Padano from Italy. The research centres are Tecnologías Avanzadas Inspiralia (coordinator); Centro Agrícola Regional de Marchamalo, Universidad Complutense de Madrid and TÜBITAK MAM, Gida Enstitüsü.

Objectives
The objective of the Apifresh project is to provide European beekeepers with the scientific and technological aids necessary to improve the quality of European pollen and royal jelly and also to promote the regulatory means that will allow European bee products compete under fair conditions against lower quality or adulterated products.

These core objectives will be realised by means of the following achievements:

 The development of a quality standard aimed at protecting European pollen and royal jelly products against adulteration and contamination induced by environmental and bee-treatment toxic components
 The development of the knowledge and technological aids necessary to enforce compliance with the proposed standard, including:
 Definition of the analytical methods necessary to determine sensory properties, bacterial load, water content, chemical composition, and presence of pesticides and heavy metals.
 Determination of bee-product authenticity and unambiguous origin identification by means of PCR techniques
 Determination of the health enhancing compounds present in bee products.
 Development of a set of best practice guidelines for beekeep
 Development of a low-cost computer vision based decision support system for the identification of pollen vegetal species, relative proportions and geographical origin.

The development of best practice guidelines aimed at improving the quality of pollen and royal jelly products in all phases of the production chain: harvesting, collecting, storage, transportation and presentation at the point of sale.

Need
The competitiveness of the European beekeeping sector is progressively falling as a consequence of decreased bee populations and abrupt snatching of market share by imports. These facts cause reduction of beekeepers’ production, implying underutilised resources, lower economies of scale, and higher production costs. In addition, products manufactured in countries with much lower quality standards and/or adulterated with substitutes are gaining market share through unfair competition.

Lack of specific regulations with respect to bee products are another threat for the beekeeping market and public health safety. Currently, there are no accepted standards for certain products like pollen and royal jelly. Few countries have guidelines or standards for products other than honey. This means it is possible to find products in the market under these labels without any quality and authenticity control.

Project status
Apifresh is in the second year of development. Currently the project has collected more than 400 pollen and 20 royal jelly samples from ten European countries. These samples have been analyzed in the two laboratories participating in the project: Marchamalo (Spain) and Tubitak (Turkey) with a third reference laboratory in Germany. A set of guidelines have been produced for the beekeepers to ensure samples are collected according to a given protocol; ensuring the quality of harvesting, transportation and storage conditions. Also strict interlaboratory validation protocols have been defined; including: a validation protocol, a validation master plan and standard format for inter-laboratory reports.

A complete set of analytics has been specified in the protocol; including the following:
 Proteins 
 Lipid
 Total carbohydrates
 Dietary fiber
 Ash
 Foreign Materials
 Genetically modified organism
 Water Content
 Flavonoids
 Enzymes
 Chloramphenicol (CAP)
 Sulfanomides and Trimethoprim
 Tetracyclines
 Streptomycin
 Chlorfenvinphos
 Nitrofurans Metabolites
 Aflatoxins
 Polycyclic aromatic hydrocarbons
 Pesticides
 Heavy metals (Cadmium Mercury, Lead, Tin)
 Macrolides : Tylosin A, Tylosin B, Erythromycin A, Erythromycin A metabolite,
 Clindamycin, Josamycin, Leucomycin, Lincomycin, Spiramycin, Tilmicosin
 Aerobic Bacteria
 E. coli
 Coliform
 Mold
 Yeast
These analyses have been performed already in the set of available samples and the results from the 2011 sample collection campaign area available. Validation for the chemical analysis has been performed following Eurochem /Citac Guide GC 4 (QUAM:2000.1, second edition) while validation studies for microbiological analysis has been done based on ISO 19036.

In addition the first computer vision software module has been completed and is already available. The module is able to separate pollen samples by its color, categorize them according to an internal dictionary of pollen species and count the relative proportions of the different pollen types in the sample. All this is done automatically in a few seconds, using a low cost video camera and PC computer. No expertise in computer vision or Melissopalynology is required. Before, this same process required at least two hours work by a skilled operator separating pollen grains by hand. As reported in scientific publications, the software achieves 94% accuracy in the identification of the pollen proportions; much higher than what is reasonably possible with a human operator.

References

Beekeeping